Sagetdao Petpaiyathai (born January 1, 1987) is a Muay Thai fighter and mixed martial artist from Thailand who is currently signed to ONE Championship. He is a former Lumpinee Stadium champion in three weight classes and is known for his strong knee and clinch style of fighting. He now teaches at Evolve MMA in Singapore.

Biography

Early life
Sagetdao is one of three children in his family, but he's the only child to have fought in Muay Thai. Sagetdao began his career at the age of 10 at the Nalakap Gym in Maha Sarakham, Northeast Thailand. He fought around 100 times for this camp over the course of 7 years. At 17 he moved to Bangkok and began training at the Kiatpetch Gym.

Muay Thai career
In 2007, he captured stadium titles at both Lumpinee Boxing Stadium and Rajadamnern Boxing Stadium. By 2008, he was a household name in the Muay Thai world and made the top fighters take notice when he knocked out veteran Nongbee Kiatyongyut on a Channel 7 broadcast.

2009

In 2009 he participated in a special rules fight where he teamed with Petchboonchu FA Group to take on #1 fighter, Saenchai Sinbimuaythai and the duo was defeated. After losing to Saenchai, Sagetdao would go to England and fight their best fighter, Liam Harrison. Sagetdao frustrated the Englishman with hard kicks and survived big punches to earn a decision. After this victory, Sagetdao would once again meet up with Saenchai, but this time he was doing it on his own. The fight took place at the annual year-end Lumpini stadium birthday show. Most expected Saenchai to win comfortably, Sagetdao, however, had other plans, and he stunned the crowd by beating Saenchai over 5 rounds.

2010–present

In 2010 he  beat fellow clinch master, Petchboonchu FA Group, and closed the year out strong by stopping Denkiri Sor. Sommai with a body punch that would be voted channel 7 fight of the year. In 2011 he beat Nong-O Sit Or, Petchboonchu FA Group, Saenchai Sinbimuaythai, and Singdam Kiatmuu9. In October he would once again fight abroad, this time in America, his opponent was American, Kevin Ross. This fight was for the WBC Diamond super lightweight belt and Sagetdao would win with a stoppage at the end of round 3 because of a large cut on Ross's head from an elbow.
In 2012 he lost his first 3 fights. In his 4th fight of the year he beat Petchboonchu FA Group, and in his 5th he beat Penek Sitnumnoi He beat Sofiane Derdega to retain the WBC super lightweight championship.

He rematched Singdam Kiatmuu9 at Lumpinee on March 8, 2013 and lost on points.

On 5 April 2013 he beat Umar Semata at Muay Thai Warriors in Pattaya to win the Muay Thai Warriors World Super Featherweight Title.

He defended his WBC super lightweight title against Tetsuya Yamato at M-One: Reborn in Highland, California, USA on May 16, 2013, defeating the Japanese challenger via TKO due to a cut in round four.

He lost to Pakorn Sakyothin by unanimous decision at Lumpinee on June 9, 2013.

He won the four-man 68 kg tournament at MAX Muay Thai 3 in Zhengzhou, China on August 10, 2013., beating Liam Harrison by decision in the semi-finals and defeating Zhang Dezhang after an extension round in the final.

He beat two opponents on points, Andrei Kulebin in the semi-finals and Victor Nagbe in the final, to win the tournament at MAX Muay Thai 5: The Final Chapter in Khon Kaen, Thailand on December 10, 2013.

First TKO loss to a foreigner
On February 16, 2014, Sagetdao suffered his first TKO loss and first foreigner loss to Qiu Jianliang. He was rocked numerous times by Qiu's punches during the course of the fight. Finally, he was knocked down by a straight left punch to the chin. The referee called the stoppage to the fight after Qiu finished him with flurry of punches in the last 10 seconds of the fight.

Return to Muay Thai 
Sagetdao made his return to Muay Thai at ONE Championship: Reign of Dynasties 2 on October 16, 2020. His faced Zhang Chunyu, with it being his first time competing under the ONE Super Series ruleset, as well as his first Muay Thai fight since 2014. He would go on to win by unanimous decision.

Mixed martial arts career
In 2017, Sagetdao began a career in mixed martial arts. He signed for the Singapore-based organization ONE Championship. He made his debut that March, with a first-round TKO of Kevin Ong. He finished the year with two more first-round stoppage victories, against Mahmoud Mohamed and Jimmy Yabo.	

Sagetdao suffered his first defeat in MMA on June 30, 2018. He was announced as winning his bout with Ma Jia Wen by unanimous decision, but the result was later overturned, and the win was awarded to Ma.

Titles and accomplishments

Muay Thai
MAX Muay Thai 
MAX Muay Thai 5: The Final Chapter Tournament Champion
MAX Muay Thai 3 Tournament Championship
Lumpinee Stadium 
2007 Lumpinee Stadium Feathwerweight champion
2007 Lumpinee Stadium Fighter of the Year
2010 Lumpinee Stadium Super Featherweight champion
2012 Lumpinee Stadium Lightweight champion 
Rajadamnern Stadium 
2007 Rajdamnern Stadium Featherweight champion
Channel 7 Boxing Stadium
 Channel 7 Stadium 102 lbs Champion
Muay Thai Warriors 
2011 Muay Thai Warriors Super Featherweight champion
Muay Thai Association of America 
2011 MTAA Super Lightweight champion
WBC Muaythai 
2011 WBC Diamond Super Lightweight champion
2012 WBC Super lightweight champion
World Professional Muaythai Federation 
2012 W.P.M.F. World Lightweight champion (61.235 kg)
Awards
2007 Sports Authority of Thailand Fighter of the Year
2009 Sports Authority of Thailand Fighter of the Year

Muay Thai record

|-  style="background:#cfc;"
| 2020-10-16 || Win ||align=left| Zhang Chunyu || ONE Championship: Reign of Dynasties 2 || Kallang, Singapore || Decision (Unanimous) || 3 || 3:00 
|-  style="background:#fbc;"
| 2014-11-15 || Loss ||align=left| Tetsuya Yamato || NJKF || Tokyo, Japan || TKO (Cut) || 3 || 
|-  style="background:#fbc;"
| 2014-09-05 || Loss ||align=left| Pakorn PKSaenchaimuaythaigym || Lumpinee Stadium || Bangkok, Thailand || Decision (unanimous) || 5 || 3:00 
|-  style="background:#cfc;"
| 2014-06-06 || Win ||align=left| Yodpanomrung Jitmuangnon || Lumpinee Stadium || Bangkok, Thailand || Decision (unanimous) || 5 || 3:00 
|-  style="background:#fbc;"
| 2014-05-02 || Loss ||align=left| Yodpanomrung Jitmuangnon || Lumpinee Stadium || Bangkok, Thailand || Decision (unanimous) || 5 || 3:00 
|-  style="background:#cfc;"
| 2014-04-08 ||Win ||align=left| Panpet Kiatcbaroenchai || Lumpinee Stadium || Bangkok, Thailand || Decision || 5 || 3:00 
|-  style="background:#fbc;"
| 2014-02-16 || Loss ||align=left| Qiu Jianliang || MAX Muay Thai 6 || Zhengzhou, China || TKO (Referee Stoppage) || 3 || 2:59
|-  style="background:#cfc;"
| 2013-12-10 || Win ||align=left| Victor Nagbe || MAX Muay Thai 5: The Final Chapter, Final || Khon Kaen, Thailand || Decision || 3 || 3:00
|-
! style=background:white colspan=9 | 
|-  style="background:#cfc;"
| 2013-12-10 || Win ||align=left| Andrei Kulebin|| MAX Muay Thai 5: The Final Chapter, Semi Finals || Khon Kaen, Thailand || Decision || 3 || 3:00 
|-  style="background:#cfc;"
| 2013-08-10 || Win ||align=left| Zhang Dezheng || MAX Muay Thai 3, Final || Zhengzhou, China || Extension round decision || 4 || 3:00 
|-
! style=background:white colspan=9 | 
|-  style="background:#cfc;"
| 2013-08-10 || Win ||align=left| Liam Harrison|| MAX Muay Thai 3, Semi Finals || Zhengzhou, China || Decision || 3 || 3:00 
|-  style="background:#fbc;"
| 2013-07-09 || Loss ||align=left| Pakorn PKSaenchaimuaythaigym || Lumpinee Stadium || Bangkok, Thailand || Decision (unanimous) || 5 || 3:00 
|-  style="background:#cfc;"
| 2013-05-16 || Win ||align=left| Tetsuya Yamato || M-One: Reborn || Highland, California, USA || TKO (cut) || 4 || 1:38
|-
! style=background:white colspan=9 |
|-  style="background:#cfc;"
| 2013-04-05 ||Win ||align=left| Umar Semata || Muay Thai Warriors || Thailand || Decision || 5 || 3:00
|-  style="background:#fbc;"
| 2013-03-08 ||Loss ||align=left| Singdam Kiatmuu9 || Lumpinee Stadium || Bangkok, Thailand || Decision || 5 || 3:00 
|-  style="background:#cfc;"
| 2012-12-07 ||Win ||align=left| Mongkolchai Kwaitonggym || Lumpinee Stadium || Bangkok, Thailand || Decision || 5 || 3:00 
|-  style="background:#fbc;"
| 2012-11-11 ||Loss ||align=left| Wanchalerm Uddonmuang || || Phatthalung, Thailand || Decision || 5 || 3:00 
|-  style="background:#fbc;"
| 2012-09-07 ||Loss ||align=left| Petchboonchu FA Group || Lumpinee Stadium || Bangkok, Thailand || Decision || 5 || 3:00 
|-  style="background:#cfc;"
| 2012-06-09 ||Win ||align=left| Sofiane Dergdega || WBC Battle for the Belts || Thailand || TKO (cut) || 3 || 
|-  style="background:#cfc;"
| 2012-07-07 ||Win ||align=left| Penake Sitnumnoi || || Phatthalung, Thailand || Decision || 5 || 3:00 
|-
! style=background:white colspan=9 |
|-  style="background:#cfc;"
| 2012-07-07 ||Win ||align=left| Petchboonchu FA Group || || Surathani, Thailand || Decision || 5 || 3:00 
|-  style="background:#fbc;"
| 2012-04-03 ||Loss ||align=left| Singdam Kiatmuu9 || Lumpinee Stadium || Bangkok, Thailand || Decision || 5 || 3:00 
|-  style="background:#fbc;"
| 2012-03-09 ||Loss ||align=left| Saenchai Sinbimuaythai || Lumpinee Stadium || Bangkok, Thailand || Decision || 5 || 3:00 
|-  style="background:#fbc;"
| 2012-02-07 ||Loss ||align=left| Wanchalerm Uddonmuang || Lumpinee Stadium || Bangkok, Thailand || Decision || 5 || 3:00 
|-  style="background:#cfc;"
| 2011-12-09 ||Win ||align=left| Saenchai Sinbimuaythai || Lumpinee Stadium || Bangkok, Thailand || Decision || 5 || 3:00 
|-  style="background:#cfc;"
| 2011-10-21 ||Win ||align=left| Kevin Ross ||M1 Muay Thai Nokia Theater || Los Angeles, USA || TKO (cut) || 3 || 3:00 
|-  style="background:#cfc;"
| 2011-09-06 ||Win ||align=left| Singdam Kiatmuu9 || Lumpinee Stadium || Bangkok, Thailand || Decision || 5 || 3:00 
|-  style="background:#fbc;"
| 2011-07-07 ||Loss ||align=left| Petchboonchu FA Group || Rajadamnern Stadium || Bangkok, Thailand || Decision || 5 || 3:00 
|-  style="background:#cfc;"
| 2011-06-10 ||Win ||align=left| Saenchai Sinbimuaythai || Lumpinee Stadium || Bangkok, Thailand || Decision || 5 || 3:00 
|-
! style=background:white colspan=9 |
|-  style="background:#fbc;"
| 2011-05-05 ||Loss ||align=left| Singdam Kiatmuu9 || Rajadamnern Stadium || Bangkok, Thailand || Decision || 5 || 3:00 
|-  style="background:#cfc;"
| 2011-03-08 ||Win ||align=left| Petchboonchu FA Group || Lumpinee Stadium || Bangkok, Thailand || Decision || 5 || 3:00 
|-
! style=background:white colspan=9 |
|-  style="background:#cfc;"
| 2011-01-25 ||Win ||align=left| Nong-O Sit Or || Lumpinee Stadium || Bangkok, Thailand || Decision || 5 || 3:00 
|-  style="background:#cfc;"
| 2010-11-14 ||Win ||align=left| Denkiri Sor. Sommai || Channel 7 || Bangkok, Thailand || KO (punch) || 4 || 
|-  style="background:#fbc;"
| 2010-09-03 ||Loss ||align=left| Petchboonchu FA Group || Lumpinee Stadium || Bangkok, Thailand || Decision || 5 || 3:00 
|-  style="background:#fbc;"
| 2010-07-13 ||Loss ||align=left| Saenchai Sinbimuaythai || Lumpinee Stadium || Bangkok, Thailand || Decision || 5 || 3:00 
|-  style="background:#fbb;"
| 2010-06-04 || Loss||align=left| Petchboonchu FA Group || Lumpinee Stadium || Bangkok, Thailand || Decision || 5 || 3:00 
|-
! style=background:white colspan=9 |
|-  style="background:#cfc;"
| 2010-05-07 ||Win ||align=left| Petchboonchu FA Group || Lumpinee Stadium || Bangkok, Thailand || Decision || 5 || 3:00 
|-  style="background:#cfc;"
| 2010-03-13 || Win ||align=left| Mehdi Zatout || France VS Thaïlande || Bagnolet, France || Decision || 5 || 3:00
|-  style="background:#fbc;"
| 2010-02-12 ||Loss ||align=left| Nong-O Sit Or || Lumpinee Stadium || Bangkok, Thailand || Decision || 5 || 3:00 
|-  style="background:#cfc;"
| 2009-12-08 ||Win ||align=left| Saenchai Sinbimuaythai || Lumpinee Stadium || Bangkok, Thailand || Decision || 5 || 3:00 
|-
! style=background:white colspan=9 |
|-  style="background:#cfc;"
| 2009-11-07 ||Win ||align=left| Liam Harrison || MSA Muay Thai || England, UK || TKO body kick || 5 || 3:00 
|-  style="background:#cfc;"
| 2009-08-31 ||Win ||align=left| Daoprakay Or. Kwanmuang || Rajadamnern Stadium || Bangkok, Thailand || Decision || 5 || 3:00 
|-  style="background:#fbc;"
| 2009-07-03 ||Loss ||align=left| Saenchai Sinbimuaythai || Lumpinee Stadium || Bangkok, Thailand || Decision || 5 || 3:00 
|-  style="background:#fbc;"
| 2009-06-21 ||Loss ||align=left| Jomthong Chuwattana || Rajadamnern Stadium || Bangkok, Thailand || Decision || 5 || 3:00 
|-  style="background:#cfc;"
| 2009-04-30 ||Win ||align=left| Anuwat Kaewsamrit || Rajadamnern Stadium || Bangkok, Thailand || Decision || 5 || 3:00 
|-  style="background:#cfc;"
| 2009-- ||Win ||align=left| Chok Eminentair || Channel 7 || Bangkok, Thailand || Decision || 5 || 3:00 
|-  style="background:#cfc;"
| 2008-12-28 ||Win ||align=left| Nongbee Kiatyongyut || Channel 7 || Bangkok, Thailand || KO (punch) || 3 || 3:00 
|-  style="background:#cfc;"
| 2008-10-02 ||Win ||align=left| Petsanguon Sitniwal || Rajadamnern Stadium || Bangkok, Thailand || Decision || 5 || 3:00 
|-  style="background:#fbc;"
| 2008-08-22 ||Loss ||align=left| Jomthong Chuwattana || Lumpinee Stadium || Bangkok, Thailand || Decision || 5 || 3:00 

|-  style="background:#cfc;"
| 2008-07-31 || Win ||align=left| Nongbee Kiatyongyut || Daorung Chujaroen, Rajadamnern Stadium || Bangkok, Thailand || Decision || 5 || 3:00
|-  style="background:#c5d2ea;"
| 2008-07-01 || Draw||align=left| Nongbee Kiatyongyut || Sangmorakot, Lumpinee Stadium || Bangkok, Thailand || Decision || 5 || 3:00
|-  style="background:#cfc;"
| 2008-03-04 ||Win ||align=left| Jomthong Chuwattana || Lumpinee Stadium || Bangkok, Thailand || Decision || 5 || 3:00 
|-  style="background:#fbc;"
| 2007-12-07 || Loss ||align=left| Nong-O Sit Or || Lumpinee Stadium || Bangkok, Thailand || Decision || 5 || 3:00
|-  style="background:#cfc;"
| 2007-11-09 ||Win ||align=left| Rittidet Sombatjaren || Lumpinee Stadium || Bangkok, Thailand || Decision || 5 || 3:00 
|-  style="background:#cfc;"
| 2007-05-29 || Win ||align=left| Pansak Look Bor Kor || Lumpinee Stadium || Bangkok, Thailand || Decision || 5 || 3:00
|-  style="background:#cfc;"
| 2007-02-23 ||Win ||align=left| Ninmongkon Kaennorsing || Lumpinee Stadium || Bangkok, Thailand || Decision || 5 || 3:00 
|-  style="background:#cfc;"
| 2007-01-26 ||Win ||align=left| Wanchana Sasaprapagym || Lumpinee Stadium || Bangkok, Thailand || Decision || 5 || 3:00 
|-  style="background:#fbc;"
| 2006-12-28 ||Loss ||align=left| Pansak Look Bor Kor || Lumpinee Stadium || Bangkok, Thailand || Decision || 5 || 3:00 
|-  style="background:#cfc;"
| 2006-11-03 ||Win ||align=left| Pansak Look Bor Kor || Lumpinee Stadium || Bangkok, Thailand || Decision || 5 || 3:00 
|-  style="background:#fbc;"
| 2006-09-29 ||Loss ||align=left| Ragkiat Kiatprapat || Lumpinee Stadium || Bangkok, Thailand || Decision || 5 || 3:00 
|-  style="background:#cfc;"
| 2006-08-15 ||Win ||align=left| Pinsiam Sor.Amnuaysirichoke || Lumpinee Stadium || Bangkok, Thailand || Decision || 5 || 3:00 
|-  style="background:#fbc;"
| 2006-04-04 ||Loss ||align=left| Kanchai C Sangprapai || Lumpinee Stadium || Bangkok, Thailand || Decision || 5 || 3:00 
|-  style="background:#cfc;"
| 2006-03-07 ||Win ||align=left| Hansuk V Soontonnon || Lumpinee Stadium || Bangkok, Thailand || Decision || 5 || 3:00 
|-  style="background:#cfc;"
| 2005-12-27 ||Win ||align=left| Visanlak Sor.Todsapon || Lumpinee Stadium || Bangkok, Thailand || Decision || 5 || 3:00 
|-  style="background:#cfc;"
| 2005-11-08 ||Win ||align=left| Ninmongkon Kaennorsing || Lumpinee Stadium || Bangkok, Thailand || Decision || 5 || 3:00 
|-  style="background:#fbc;"
| 2005-10-11 ||Loss ||align=left| Nonmongkon Kaennorsing || Lumpinee Stadium || Bangkok, Thailand || Decision || 5 || 3:00 
|-  style="background:#cfc;"
| 2005-06-07 ||Win ||align=left| Denchiangkwan Leamtongkarnpet || Lumpinee Stadium || Bangkok, Thailand || Decision || 5 || 3:00 
|-  style="background:#fbc;"
| 2005-04-12 ||Loss ||align=left| Therdhailak Nakontongparkview || Lumpinee Stadium || Bangkok, Thailand || Decision || 5 || 3:00 
|-  style="background:#cfc;"
| 2005-03-01 ||Win ||align=left| Maneedaeng Kiatprapat || Lumpinee Stadium || Bangkok, Thailand || Decision || 5 || 3:00 
|-  style="background:#fbc;"
| 2005-02-08 ||Loss ||align=left| Maneedaeng Kiatprapat || Lumpinee Stadium || Bangkok, Thailand || Decision || 5 || 3:00 
|-  style="background:#cfc;"
| 2004-09-10 ||Win ||align=left| Yodtuantong Baskamaraigym || Lumpinee Stadium || Bangkok, Thailand || Decision || 5 || 3:00 
|-  style="background:#cfc;"
| 2004-05-11 ||Win ||align=left| German Rungleamfarn || Lumpinee Stadium || Bangkok, Thailand || Decision || 5 || 3:00 
|-  style="background:#cfc;"
| 2004-01-09 ||Win ||align=left| Yokkao B Burapha || Lumpinee Stadium || Bangkok, Thailand || Decision || 5 || 3:00 
|-
| colspan=9 | Legend:

Mixed martial arts record

|-
| Loss
| align=center| 3–1
| Ma Jia Wen
| Decision (Unanimous)
| ONE Championship: Spirit Of A Warrior
| 
| align=center| 3
| align=center| 5:00
|Yangon, Myanmar
| 
|-
| Win
| align=center| 3–0
| Jimmy Yabo
| KO/TKO (knee)
| ONE Championship: Warriors of the World
| 
| align=center| 1
| align=center| 2:44
|IMPACT Arena, Bangkok, Thailand
| 
|-
| Win
| align=center| 2–0
| Mahmoud Mohamed
| KO/TKO (punches)
| ONE Championship: Shanghai
| 
| align=center| 1
| align=center| 1:41
|Shanghai Oriental Sports Center, Shanghai, China
| 
|-
| Win
| align=center| 1–0
| Kelvin Ong
| KO/TKO (knee & punches)
| ONE Championship: Warrior Kingdom
| 
| align=center| 1
| align=center| 2:20
|IMPACT Arena, Bangkok, Thailand
|

References

1987 births
Sagetdao Petpayathai
Featherweight mixed martial artists
Mixed martial artists utilizing Muay Thai
Sagetdao Petpayathai
Lightweight kickboxers
Living people
Sagetdao Petpayathai
ONE Championship kickboxers